Clondrohid is a village and civil parish in County Cork, Ireland, four miles (6 km) north of Macroom. As of the 2016 census, the population of the village was recorded as 179, down from 188 people as of the 2011 census.

Geography
Parishes adjoining Clondrohid include Aghabulloge, Ballyvourney, Drishane, Kilcorney, Kilnamartry, and Macroom.

The townlands of Clondrohid were part of the barony of West Muskerry.

Clondrohid lies within the Cork North-West Dáil constituency.

Amenities

Local amenities include Clondrohid National School and community hall and a number of shops, pubs and services. A childcare facility is next to the GAA pitch which is also a preschool and an afterschool.

Carrigaphooca Castle is in one of the neighbouring townlands. Carrigaphooca stone circle, about 3,000 years old, stands next to it.

Much of the western side of the village is a part of the Irish-speaking area or Gaeltacht. Some pupils of the national school go to the second level school in Ballyvourney to further their education through the medium of Irish. Others go to the De La Salle, St. Marys and McEgan College in Macroom. Cluain Droichead is the birthplace of the Irish scholar Peadar Ó Laoghaire (1839-1920).

See also
 List of towns and villages in Ireland

References

Towns and villages in County Cork